The Sigma 18-35mm f/1.8 DC HSM Art lens is a fast, constant-aperture wide standard zoom lens made by Sigma Corporation. It was announced April 18, 2013.

This lens, at its time of manufacturing, was considered a game changer  due to it being the only standard zoom boasting a constant f/1.8 aperture. The lens was designed specifically for crop body DSLRs enabling a crop factor adjusted (full frame equivalent) of f/2.88 for Canon or f/2.7 for Nikon crop body DSLRs across an equivalent range of 28mm-56mm (Canon full frame adjusted) or 27mm-53mm (Nikon full frame adjusted).

In the year of its introduction, the lens won an EXC!TE award and was named Lens of the Year at the Camera Grand Prix.

References

http://www.dpreview.com/products/sigma/lenses/sigma_18-35_1p8/specifications

018-035mm f 1.8 DC HSM Art
A-mount lenses
EF-S-mount lenses
F-mount lenses
K-mount lenses
Camera lenses introduced in 2013